The 2015 Nordic Golf League was the 17th season of the Nordic Golf League, one of four third-tier tours recognised by the European Tour. In July, it was announced that all Nordic Golf League events, beginning with the Master Promo Open, would receive Official World Golf Ranking points at the minimum level of 4 points for a winner of a 54-hole event.

With the exception of a four-event Winter Series held in Spain and the ECCO German Masters, all tournaments were held in Norway, Sweden, Finland, or Denmark. Although the ranking was calculated in euros, many prize funds were set in Danish krone or Swedish krona.

Schedule
The following table lists official events during the 2015 season.

Order of Merit
The Order of Merit was titled as the Road to Europe and was based on prize money won during the season, calculated using a points-based system. The top five players on the tour (not otherwise exempt) earned status to play on the 2016 Challenge Tour.

See also
2015 Danish Golf Tour
2015 Swedish Golf Tour

Notes

References

Nordic Golf League